is a 2011 Japanese anime television series based on Ryūhei Tamura's manga series of the same name. The animated series was produced by Pierrot+ under the direction of Yoshihiro Takamoto. The series follows high school delinquent Tatsumi Oga, who is forced to raise Beelzebub, the son of the Devil King who was sent to earth to destroy humanity. An original video animation was shown at the Jump Super Anime Tour between October 23 and November 21, 2010. The television series began airing in Japan on Yomiuri TV from January 9, 2011. The television series uses ten pieces of theme music, five openings and five endings. The third opening theme, "Hey!!!" by FLOW is used from episodes 24 onward. The fourth opening theme Baby U! by MBLAQ is used from episodes 36 to 48. The fifth opening theme is Only you -Kimi to no Kizuna- by Lc5 is used from episodes 49 onward. The third ending theme, "Nanairo Namida" by Tomato n'Pine is used from episodes 24 to 35. The fourth ending is "Papepipu Papipepu papepipupo" by Nozomi Sasaki is used from episodes 36 to 48. The fifth ending is Shōjo Traveler by 9nine is used from episodes 49 onward.

OVA

Episode list

References

Beelzebub